Pandivirilia is a genus of flies belonging to the family Therevidae.

The species of this genus are found in Europe, Japan and Northern America.

Species:
 Pandivirilia albifrons (Say, 1829) 
 Pandivirilia amurensis Lyneborg, 1986

References

Therevidae